Blackbirds is a lost 1920 silent film crime drama produced and distributed by Realart Pictures, an affiliate of Paramount. It is based on a 1913 Broadway play Blackbirds by Harry James Smith. A previous 1915 version starred Laura Hope Crews who starred in the play. This version stars Justine Johnstone and William "Stage" Boyd.

Cast
Justine Johnstone - Countess Leonie
William "Stage" Boyd - Detective(*billed as William Boyd)
Charles K. Gerrard - Duval
Jessie Arnold - Suzanne
Walter Walker - Howard Crocker
Marie Shotwell - Edna Crocker
Grace Parker - Arline Crocker 
Ada Boshell - Grandma Crocker
Alex Saskins - Griggs
Mabel Bert

References

External links
Blackbirds at IMDb.com
lantern slide to the film(new url)
kinotv.com

1920 films
American silent feature films
Lost American films
American films based on plays
Films directed by John Francis Dillon
American crime drama films
American black-and-white films
1920 crime drama films
1920 lost films
1920s American films
Silent American drama films